Spirorbis is a genus of very small polychaete worms, usually with a white coiled shell. Members of the genus live in the lower littoral and sublittoral zones of rocky shores. Spirorbis worms usually live attached to seaweeds, but some species live directly on rocks, shells or other hard substrates. Spirorbis was once thought to have a fossil record extending back into the Early Paleozoic, but now all pre-Cretaceous spirorbins are known to be microconchids. The earliest members of genus appeared in the Miocene, but Oligocene finds may
also be possible. The genus contains the following species:
 Spirorbis borealis Daudin, 1800
 Spirorbis corallinae De Silva and Knight-jones, 1962
 Spirorbis cuneatus Gee, 1964
 Spirorbis granulatus
 Spirorbis incongruus
 Spirorbis inornatus L'hardy and Quievreux, 1962
 Spirorbis knightjonesi Desilva, 1965
 Spirorbis lineatus
 Spirorbis marioni (Caullery and Mesnil, 1897)
 Spirorbis medius
 Spirorbis moerchi
 Spirorbis nakamurai
 Spirorbis quadrangularis
 Spirorbis quasimilitaris Bailey, 1970
 Spirorbis rupestris Gee and Knight-jones, 1962
 Spirorbis semidentatus
 Spirorbis similis
 Spirorbis spirorbis (Linnaeus, 1758)
 Spirorbis steueri Sterzinger, 1909
 Spirorbis tridentata Levinsen, 1883
 Spirorbis variabilis
 Spirorbis violaceus

References

External links
  General spirorbid morphology and ecology

Serpulidae
Polychaete genera
Extant Miocene first appearances
Taxa named by François Marie Daudin
Paleozoic life of Ontario
Paleozoic life of Alberta
Paleozoic life of the Northwest Territories
Paleozoic life of Quebec